Kristen Karen Lising Davila-Sta. Ana (born November 21, 1970), professionally known as Karen Davila, is a Filipino journalist.

Early life
Davila went to high school at the Colegio San Agustin – Makati. She took a degree of Bachelor of Arts major in Mass Communication at the University of the Philippines Diliman in Quezon City.

Achievements
As a professional journalist, she has received awards internationally, including an award from the New York Festival and the Ten Outstanding Young Men Awards for Broadcast Journalism in 2008. She has more than 20 awards in the professional journalism field from both local and international organizations. She was one of People Asia magazine's "People of the Year" in 2013. She was also recognized by the Philippine Senate as one of the Outstanding Women in the Nation's Service (TOWNS). Esquire magazine named her the "Sexiest Woman Alive" in 2015, citing beauty and brains as the sheer formula for the declaration.

Personal life
Davila is married to DJ Sta. Ana, Head of Operations for TV5's News5. Together, they have two children, named David and Lucas. She is an advocate for people with special needs, children's rights, government transparency, and journalism.

She is the aunt of Filipino-American actor and YouTube content creator Wil Dasovich.

Davila announced on January 9, 2022, during her conversation with Filipino physician Tony Leachon in her ANC program, Headstart, that she and her family caught COVID-19, although she indicated that they were recovering from the disease. On January 15, she posted on Instagram that she and her fellow TV Patrol anchors Alvin Elchico and Gretchen Fullido have survived COVID-19. On her 52nd birthday, she revealed on Instagram that she had recovered from COVID-19 for a second time.

Filmography

Television

Radio

External links

References

1970 births
Filipino radio journalists
Living people
People from Iloilo
University of the Philippines Diliman alumni
Filipino television news anchors
GMA Network personalities
GMA Integrated News and Public Affairs people
ABS-CBN personalities
ABS-CBN News and Current Affairs people
Visayan people